Kim Bo-kyung (3 April 1976 – 2 February 2021) was a South Korean actress. She made her acting debut in 1995, and appeared in both television and film, notably Friend (2001), Epitaph (2007), Paju (2009) and The Day He Arrives (2011).

Kim died on 2 February 2021, after an 11-year battle with liver cancer. She was laid to rest on 5 February in Busan Memorial Park.

Filmography

Film

Television series

Awards and nominations

References

External links
 
 
 Kim Bo-kyung at Koom Entertainment
 
 
 

1976 births
2021 deaths
South Korean television actresses
South Korean film actresses
Actresses from Busan
Seoul Institute of the Arts alumni
Deaths from liver cancer
Deaths from cancer in South Korea